Barling is a surname. Notable people with the surname include:

Bert Barling (1878–1952), Australian rules footballer
Gerald Barling (born 1949), English judge
Gilbert Barling (1855–1940), English surgeon
John Barling (1804–1883), English dissenting minister
Kurt Barling (born 1961), British journalist
Ron Barling (1912–2001), Australian rules footballer
Tim Barling (born 1965), Australian rules footballer
Tom Barling (1906–1993), English cricketer